1982 was the 18th season of the Japan Soccer League.

First Division
Mitsubishi tied Yanmar's four championships with its own run.

NKK could not adjust to the top flight for this season and was relegated instantly. Honda saved itself by defeating Toshiba in the playout.

Promotion/relegation Series

Second Division
Yamaha returned to the First Division at the first attempt and also had an amazing cup run, winning the Emperor's Cup.

Saitama Teachers kept its League place by defeating Seino Transportation of Gifu, while Teijin, the top representative of Matsuyama, Ehime at the time, went back to the Shikoku regional league.

Promotion/relegation Series

References
Japan - List of final tables (RSSSF)

Japan Soccer League seasons
1
Jap
Jap